"Addicted to You" is a song by Japanese-American recording artist Hikaru Utada from her second studio album Distance (2001). It was released as the album's lead single on September 6, 1999 by EMI Music Japan. "Addicted to You" was written by Utada and produced by Jimmy Jam & Terry Lewis; this is Utada's first collaboration with American producers and composers. The single artwork was shot by American photographer Richard Avedon and features two black-and-white figures of Utada. Musically, "Addicted to You" is an R&B song.

"Addicted to You" received positive reviews from music critics, many who highlighted it from the parent album; one music critic viewed the single as "nostalgic". It achieved commercial success in Japan, with a peak position of number one on the Oricon Singles Chart and a Million certification by the Recording Industry Association of Japan (RIAJ). The single remains the fourth highest selling single in first week sales, and the thirty-ninth best selling single in Japan. A music video was shot in Hong Kong, and featured Utada inside a club.

Background and release

"Addicted to You" was written by Utada and produced by Jimmy Jam & Terry Lewis; this is Utada's first collaboration with American producers and composers. The song was recorded in mid-1999 at Flyte Tyme Studios, Minneapolis, Minnesota and mixed at Flyte Tyme, Edina, Minnesota. Darnell Davis played the keyboard and Alex Richbourg played the drums. There are two versions of the track: the Up-in-Heaven mix and the Underwater mix. EMI did not originally select "Addicted to You" as the lead single as they feared it would not make an impact in Japan. The song was then re-composed in order to appeal more to the Japanese audience. "Addicted to You" is an R&B song.

"Addicted to You" was released on September 16, 1999 in CD format by EMI, as the lead single for the singer's second studio album Distance (2001). The cover sleeve features two shots of Utada, one being a close-up of Utada's face and the second being a long shot of them, and was photographed by American artist Richard Avedon, his only collaboration with Utada up until his death in October 2004 as a result of a cerebral hemorrhage. The CD featured the instrumental and radio edits of both versions.

Critical reception
"Addicted to You" received positive reviews from music critics. Editor-in-chief for Rockin'On Japan magazine Kano said that the song was "exceptional" and commended their collaboration with Jam and Lewis. Yonemoto Hiromi from Yeah!! J-Pop! was positive in his review, feeling that the composition sounded "nostalgic"-like. A staff review from CDJournal discussed Utada's first greatest hits compilation Utada Hikaru Single Collection Vol. 1 and commended Utada's "fine" vocal delivery and composition. Ian Martin from Allmusic also commended Jam and Lewis' collaboration, saying that "providing stark contrast to the cheap, tinny sound that characterized much Japanese pop of the previous decade, with "Wait & See" and "Addicted to You" both featuring the production talents of Jimmy Jam & Terry Lewis." Miko Amaranthine from Yahoo! Music listed the song at number four on his Top Ten Hikaru Utada songs, stating ""Addicted to you" is one of my favorites for a slightly greedy purpose [...] When I listen to this song, I am reminded how much I love my marriage and am thankful I do not have to play the "dating game"." At the 15th Annual Japan Gold Disc Awards, "Addicted to You" and Utada's previous singles "Automatic" and "Movin' on Without You" received the award for "Song of the Year".

Commercial response
"Addicted to You" debuted at number one on the Japanese Oricon Singles Chart, Utada's second number-one single since "Movin' on Without You" (1999), and stayed in the chart for fifteen weeks. First week sales sold over one million units, making it the second-highest selling single in the first charting week behind Mr. Children's "Nameless Poetry", but both positions were replaced by AKB48's "Everyday, Katyusha" and "Flying Get" in 2011. The song was certified Million by the RIAJ for shipments of one million units, selling 1.7 million units in total. "Addicted to You" is the thirty-ninth best selling single in Japan music history and Utada's second best selling single behind "Automatic/Time Will Tell". According to Oricon, the song was Utada's fourth million-selling single.

"Addicted to You" reached number one on the Japanese Count Down TV Chart for two weeks, and remained on the chart for thirteen weeks. This was their fourth consecutive number one on the chart, following "Automatic/Time Will Tell", "Movin' on Without You", and "First Love". In the Annual 1999 Count Down TV chart, "Addicted to You" was placed at number five.

Promotion and other appearances
Wataru Takeishi directed the accompanying music video, which was filmed in Hong Kong and featured Utada inside a nightclub. The music video was included on Utada's Single Clip Collection Vol. 1 (1999). "Addicted to You" has been included in four of Utada's live Japanese tours concert: Bohemian Summer 2000, Utada Unplugged, Utada in Budokan 2004-2005, and Utada United 2006. The live versions were then released on a live DVD for each tour.

Track listing
CD single
"Addicted to You" (Up-in-Heaven mix) – 5:19
"Addicted to You" (Underwater mix) – 6:17
"Addicted to You" (Up-in-Heaven mix) (Instrumental) – 4:08
"Addicted to You" (Underwater mix) (Instrumental) – 5:21

Personnel
 Hikaru Utada – songwriting, composition
 Jerry Jam and Terry Lewis – arrangement, instruments, production, composition
 Teruzane Utada – arrangement, production, composition
 Akira Miyake – arrangement, production, composition
 Steve Hodge – guitar, recording
 Alex Richbourg – drums
 Darnell Davis – keyboards
 Indoh Mitsuhiro – recording
 Ugajin Masaaki – recording
 Richard Avedon – recording

Credits adapted from the promotional CD single.

Charts and certifications

Charts

Certification

Notes

References

Hikaru Utada songs
1999 singles
Oricon Weekly number-one singles
Songs written by Hikaru Utada
Song recordings produced by Jimmy Jam and Terry Lewis
EMI Music Japan singles
1999 songs